Carex viridula, known as little green sedge, green sedge, or greenish sedge, is a small flowering plant native to North America, Europe, Asia, and Morocco.

Taxonomy
Carex viridula is in the section Carex sect. Ceratocystis, a circumboreal group with around six other species, although the taxonomy of this group is controversial, and up to 19 species have been recognized.

Flora of North America accepts the following three subspecies and two varieties of Carex viridula:

Carex viridula subsp. brachyrrhyncha
Carex viridula var. elatior
Carex viridula var. saxilittoralis
Carex viridula subsp. oedocarpa
Carex viridula subsp. viridula

, Kew's Plants of the World Online lists Carex viridula as a synonym of Carex oederi.

There is also variety Carex viridula var. bergrothii (Palmgr.) B.Schmid (synonym Carex bergrothii Palmgr.).

Conservation status
It is listed as endangered in Connecticut and Pennsylvania. It is listed as threatened in Illinois.

References

viridula
Flora of North America
Flora of Europe
Flora of Asia